The 2019 Northwest Territories Scotties Tournament of Hearts, the territorial women's curling championship for Northwest Territories, was held January 10-11 at the Yellowknife Curling Centre in Yellowknife, Northwest Territories. 

Only two teams entered the event, the defending champion Kerry Galusha rink from Yellowknife and the 2019 territorial junior champion Tyanna Bain rink from Inuvik. As such, the event was a best-of-five series. Galusha easily beat the Bain rink in three games. Team Galusha represented Northwest Territories at the 2019 Scotties Tournament of Hearts, Canada's national women's curling championship.

Teams

The teams are listed as follows:

Scores

Game #1
January 10, 8:00pm

Game #2
January 11, 10:00am

Game #3
January 11, 2:30pm

References

Saskatchewan Scotties Tournament of Hearts
2019 in the Northwest Territories
Northwest Territories Scotties Tournament of Hearts
Curling in the Northwest Territories
Sport in Yellowknife